Karl Johan Axel-Erik "Gyllen" Gyllenstolpe (18 April 1894 – 19 July 1954) was a Swedish track and field athlete. He competed in the 1920 Summer Olympics and placed eighth in the decathlon event. He also finished ninth in the pentathlon, though he did not start in the final 1500 metres run.

References

1894 births
1954 deaths
Swedish decathletes
Swedish pentathletes
Olympic athletes of Sweden
Athletes (track and field) at the 1920 Summer Olympics
Olympic decathletes
People from Filipstad
Sportspeople from Värmland County